Smithland Lock and Dam is the 18th lock and dam on the Ohio River, 919 miles down stream of Pittsburgh and 63 miles upstream from the confluence of the  Mississippi with the Ohio. There are 2 locks for commercial barge traffic that are 1,200 feet long by 110 feet wide.

History
Smithland lock and dam was authorized in 1965 to replace lock and dam 50 and 51 on the Ohio River.

See also
 List of locks and dams of the Ohio River
 List of locks and dams of the Upper Mississippi River

References

External links

U.S. Army Corps of Engineers, Pittsburgh District
U.S. Army Corps of Engineers, Huntington District
U.S. Army Corps of Engineers, Louisville District

Dams on the Ohio River
Dams in Kentucky
Dams in Illinois
Dams completed in 1980
Locks of Kentucky
Locks of Illinois
1980 establishments in Illinois
1980 establishments in Kentucky